KRT39 is a keratin gene.